The Division of Angas was an Australian Electoral Division in South Australia. The division was created in 1949 and abolished in 1977. It was named for George Fife Angas, a South Australian pioneer.

Angas was based in eastern and north-eastern rural areas including Mount Barker, Murray Bridge and Renmark. Until 1955 the seat had originally continued north, half way to the northern border of South Australia. From that point, the seat's boundaries remained relatively stable. It was a safe to very safe seat for the Liberal Party throughout its history.

Members

Election results

See also
 Division of Angas (1903-34)

Angas (1949-77)
Constituencies established in 1949
1949 establishments in Australia
Constituencies disestablished in 1977
1977 disestablishments in Australia